In the 2002–03 Yemeni League, Al-Sha'ab Ibb won the championship.

Final table

External links

Yem
Yemeni League seasons
football
football